Giuliano Crognale (10 July 1770 – 20 July 1862) was an Italian poet and painter, active in illuminated manuscripts and oil painting of sacred and historical subjects.

Biography
He was born in Castel Frentano, province of Chieti, Abruzzo. His father was a physician. He initially studied literature and classics in a religious school and seminary in Lanciano. In 1787, he moved  to Naples to study law. He gravitated to study painting under Raffaele Ciappa. In 1790, he moved to Rome, where he worked under the Sienese painter, Salvatore Tonci. Within a year he had returned to Lanciano.

During the 1790s, he showed sympathy for the Republican interests and this led to his incarceration by the local Bourbon authorities in Castelnuovo. He gained release by promising to write a panegyric poem about his captors. However, by 1799 he came under proscription again, and under a sentence of death, he fled into exile at Fermo until 1801, when he received amnesty. In his later years, he dedicated himself to writing polemics and poetry.

Works
Chiesa Santuario del Miracolo Eucaristico, Lanciano
Chiesa di Santo Stefano, Castel Frentano
Chiesa del Santissimo Rosario, Castel Frentano
Santuario dell' Assunta, Castel Frentano

References

1770 births
1862 deaths
18th-century Italian painters
Italian male painters
19th-century Italian painters
Italian poets
People from Chieti
19th-century Italian poets
Manuscript illuminators
Italian male poets
19th-century Italian male writers
19th-century Italian male artists
18th-century Italian male artists